Lilly is an unincorporated community located in Rockingham County, in the U.S. state of Virginia. It is located west of Harrisonburg, Virginia along Route 613, northeast of Clover Hill, near the edge of the  George Washington National Forest.

References

Unincorporated communities in Rockingham County, Virginia
Unincorporated communities in Virginia